Does This Look Infected? is the second studio album by Canadian rock band Sum 41. It was released on November 26, 2002.

It is their only album to feature a Parental Advisory label on the cover, despite the fact that other albums by the band also feature profanity. It was released in both explicit and edited versions.

Music, lyrics and composition 
The album is a lot more aggressive, darker and heavier than Sum 41's previous studio album, All Killer No Filler. It also has fewer elements of pop music than All Killer No Filler. Described as heavy metal, horror punk, punk rock, pop punk, and melodic hardcore, the album uses elements of heavy metal, hardcore punk, thrash metal, d-beat and, on the song "Thanks for Nothing", hip hop. Although the album has been described as pop punk by some sources, Counterculture.co.uk considered it an album that shows Sum 41 abandoning the pop punk genre for a more standard punk rock style. Amy Sciarretto of ARTISTdirect wrote that Does This Look Infected? soldifies Sum 41 as "true punk stalwarts". The music on Does This Look Infected? has been compared to bands such as The Offspring, P.O.D., Metallica, Rancid, Iron Maiden, Judas Priest, Bad Religion, NOFX, Green Day and 

The album's lyrical topics are darker than the lyrical topics on All Killer No Filler. Sum 41's vocalist Deryck Whibley said, "A lot of stuff happened in the past year that opened our eyes to new things," Whibley said. "The whole last year has been really crazy around the world. There's been so much stuff going on and it's been so televised. I think we've all become more aware. When we were writing the last record everything was happy go lucky. Now this time we've seen a little bit more and our eyes have been opened up a little bit." The album's lyrical topics include hatred, war, internal demons, disliking the world, suicide, drugs, insomnia and HIV. The song "Mr. Amsterdam" is about an embittered man. Whibley said, "'Mr. Amsterdam' is sort of about a guy who hates everything, very bitter person who kind of hates the world." He explains, "He's against the world." The song is also about the complacency of pop culture in 2002, the year that Does This Look Infected? was released, and technology that was new during the year that the album was released. Whibley explained the meaning of "Mr. Amsterdam", saying, "We depend so much on new technology to make sure that we don't have to do anything. Everything's being laid out so we can sit at home and do nothing and never leave our homes. You can order all your groceries from the computer. You can do anything you want. You can just sit there and become fatter. And I think that's bad."

Lead guitarist Dave Baksh explained the meaning of the song "All Messed Up", saying, "There's a song called 'All Messed Up,' which is about doing drugs . . . just what we feel when we're on drugs." When Whibley spoke about "All Messed Up", he said, "It's about those kinds of nights. It's just about being really messed up and in that whole cracked-out kind of state." "The Hell Song" is about a friend of Sum 41 who contracted HIV. Whibley spoke about "The Hell Song" saying, "It’s one of my favorite songs on the record. It's about this girl I used to date who I've known forever. Just last Christmas she found that she was HIV positive, and it was so brutal. She doesn't sleep around. She's only had two or three boyfriends and one of them used to cheat on her all the time, and then he got it and gave it to her. It's the heaviest thing that's happened in our group of friends." "No Brains" is about a former band member of Sum 41. Whibley explained the song's meaning, saying, "That's just a basic 'fuck you, I'm done' kind of song. This guy was our old singer and I was best friends with him. We had this big falling out." Whibley explained what the song "Over My Head (Better Off Dead)" is about. He said, "It's not about being fucked up or drunk. It's more about the aftermath when you're hearing everything you've just done the night before, and you're like, "Ah, fuck, I'm better off dead." I don't regret any of the things I do and I don't mind doing them, I just hate hearing about it. Being told every morning, "Dude, what did you do last night?" drives me nuts."

"Still Waiting" was written after the September 11 attacks. Whibley explained the meaning of the song, saying, "It's not directly about 9/11 or the war on terrorism. It's about the war on everything. It's about the world as we know it. It's no secret that the world doesn't get along and there's all this hatred. It's everything to do with how this world functions." Whibley stated on the band's DVD, Sake Bombs And Happy Endings, that the album's song "A.N.I.C." is a "special love song" dedicated to Anna Nicole Smith. According to him, "A.N.I.C." stands for 'Anna Nicole is a Cunt'." Sum 41 member Dave Baksh said that Anna Nicole Smith is "a fuckin' loser" and also said, "Look what she's doing to herself." Sum 41 stopped including the song in their live performances after Smith died of an overdose in 2007. However, they put "A.N.I.C." back into their setlist during the 2012 summer European leg of the Screaming Bloody Murder Tour. When Sum 41 performed the song live after Smith's death, the band would not show any disrespect towards her, with Whibley saying that the song "A.N.I.C." stands for "Deryck Whibley is a Fucking Stupid Cunt". However, since 2018, Whibley has resumed using Anna Nicole's name in the title.

Cover and title 
The cover for Does This Look Infected? shows drummer Steve Jocz dressed as a zombie. It was chosen months before the title. The album was almost delayed by the label because the band members did not have a name for it on time until Whibley thought of the name Does This Look Infected?. The whole band laughed at the idea and chose it. The same idea was also used on the band's EP Does This Look Infected Too?, except Jocz was replaced with Whibley, also dressed as a zombie.

Reception

Critical reception
Does This Look Infected? has received positive reviews from music critics. On Metacritic, the album has 75 out of 100. E! Online said that it "has a clutch of songs that mix chord-y abandon with raging rock riffs--and a heck of a lot of good times". Blender also gave it a positive review, saying, "So Sum 41 have grown up... a little.... It's all relative, and, crucially, it still rocks."

Commercial performance
Does This Look Infected? debuted at #8 on the Canadian Albums Chart, selling 17,000 copies in Canada in its first week. The album gained commercial success, with singles "The Hell Song" and "Still Waiting" mainly gaining success on the modern rock charts. The album has since sold over 4.5 million copies worldwide, but the album did not have as much success as the band's previous album "All Killer No Filler".

Legacy
The album was included at number 28 on Rock Sounds "The 51 Most Essential Pop Punk Albums of All Time" list. The band toured to celebrate its 10th anniversary in 2012, and its 15th anniversary in 2018, playing the album in its entirety. Whibley himself stated he was not satisfied with how the album was mixed, stating "I’ve always, always hated the way this album sounds. I hated it in the studio and it still bothers me. The demo I made myself at home sounded better than the final mix."

Track listing

Bonus DVD 
The unedited version includes a bonus DVD which is entitled Cross The T's and Gouge Your I's. The DVD has footage of Sum 41's alter ego band, Pain for Pleasure, titled "Reign In Pain", as well as various humorous segments like "Going Going Gonorrhea", "Campus Invasion" and "Pizza Heist and Other Crap". Also included in the DVD are the Pain for Pleasure tracks "Reign In Pain" and "WWVII Parts 1 & 2", the Autopilot Off songs "Long Way to Fall" and "Nothing Frequency", the No Warning songs "Short Fuse" and "Ill Blood", and some web-links.

Personnel

Sum 41
 Deryck Whibley – lead vocals, rhythm guitar, drums on "Reign in Pain (Heavy Metal Jamboree)" and "WWVII Parts 1 & 2"
 Dave Baksh – lead guitar, backing vocals
 Jason McCaslin – bass guitar, backing vocals
 Steve Jocz – drums, percussion; lead vocals on "Reign in Pain (Heavy Metal Jamboree)" and "WWVII Parts 1 & 2"; rapping on "Thanks for Nothing"; backing vocals on "Still Waiting"

Production

 Greig Nori – producer
 Ben Sanders – additional vocal recording assistant
 Ian Bodzasi – assistant engineer
 Steve Chawley – assistant engineer
 Chris Gordon – assistant engineer, additional engineer
 Brian Montgomery – assistant engineer
 Ross Petersen – assistant engineer
 Anthony Ruotolo – assistant engineer
 Owen Tamplin – assistant engineer
 Phil Wakeford – assistant engineer
 Josh Wilbur – Pro Tools engineer
 Ed Krautner – engineer, additional engineering and mixing
 Femio Hernandez – additional engineer
 Joel Kazmi – additional engineer
 L. Stuart Young – additional engineer
 Dan Moyse – drum technician
 Artie Smith – guitar technician
 Tony Vanias – recording administration
 Andy Wallace – mixing
 Steve Sisco – mixing assistant
 Tom Lord-Alge– mixing on "The Hell Song" 
 Howie Weinberg – mastering at Masterdisk, New York City
 Bernadette Walsh – production coordinator
 Lewis Largent – A&R
 Rob Mitchell – A&R, A&R administration
 Robert Stevenson – A&R
 Morning Breath – album design
 Jonathan Mannion – photography

Charts and certifications

Weekly charts

Year-end charts

Singles

Certifications

References 
 Citations

Sources

External links

Does This Look Infected? at YouTube (streamed copy where licensed)
 

2002 albums
Sum 41 albums
Aquarius Records (Canada) albums
Island Records albums
Albums produced by Greig Nori
Albums recorded at Metalworks Studios